The 1853 Wisconsin gubernatorial election was held on November 4, 1853. Democratic candidate William A. Barstow won the election with 55% of the vote, winning his first term as Governor of Wisconsin. Barstow defeated Free Soil Party candidate Edward D. Holton and Whig candidate Henry S. Baird. This would be the last Wisconsin gubernatorial election in which there was a Whig candidate on the ballot.

Democratic Party
William A. Barstow was a resident of Waukesha County, and had previously served as Wisconsin's Secretary of State.  Before Wisconsin became a state, he was instrumental in creating Waukesha County from what had been the western half of Milwaukee County.

The Wisconsin Democratic Party Convention was held in Janesville in September 1853.  Barstow did not intend to seek the nomination for Governor, and, in fact, was supporting A. Hyatt Smith for the nomination.  Nevertheless, Barstow's popularity resulted in him receiving five votes on the first ballot, and after Smith deadlocked with Jairus C. Fairchild for seven ballots, Smith withdrew his name and instead endorsed Barstow.  Barstow received the nomination on the 13th ballot.

Other candidates
 Jairus C. Fairchild, of Madison, had been the first State Treasurer of Wisconsin. 
 A. Hyatt Smith was the Mayor of Janesville, and had previously served as United States Attorney for Wisconsin and Attorney General of the Wisconsin Territory.
 Timothy Burns, of La Crosse, was the incumbent Lieutenant Governor of Wisconsin.  He died just days after the Democratic convention chose Barstow as the nominee.

Free Soil Party
Edward D. Holton was a resident of Milwaukee.  He was a businessman and banker, interested in building a railroad to stretch from Milwaukee to the Mississippi River.  He was an avowed abolitionist, first as a member of the Liberty Party, and then its successor the Free Soil Party.  He was also a supporter of temperance legislation in Wisconsin.

Whig Party
Henry S. Baird was a resident of Green Bay, and was said to be the first practicing lawyer in the Wisconsin Territory.  He had served as Attorney General of the Wisconsin Territory, appointed by Territorial Governor Henry Dodge, and served on the Territorial Council.  He was a delegate to Wisconsin's first Constitutional Convention.

Results

| colspan="6" style="text-align:center;background-color: #e9e9e9;"| General Election, November 8, 1853

Results by County

References

1853
Wisconsin
1853 Wisconsin elections